The Waipā River is in the Waikato region of the North Island of New Zealand. The headwaters are in the Rangitoto Range east of Te Kuiti. It is the Waikato's largest tributary. The  Waipā's main tributary is the Puniu River.

In the headwaters upstream of Ōtorohanga the river can be very clear during low flow conditions.  This section of the river flows through rough farmland and patches of native bush.  In this clearer part of the river there can be very good fly fishing for trout but access to the river may be limited without landowner permission.

In 2013 Maniapoto Māori Trust Board and the riparian local councils set up a joint management agreement for the river, following the passing of Nga Wai o Maniapoto ( Waipā River) Act 2012. On 16 July 2020 the official name was gazetted as Waipā River.

Speed of flow 

Floods 
Years with large floods have included 1875, 1892, 1893, 1897, 1907, 1926, 1930, 1946, 1953, 1958, 1986, 1988, 1989, 1991, 1995, 1998, 2002, 2004 and 2012.

In August 1893 the river was 3 inches (7.6 cm) higher than it was in during the 1875 flood. Maunder's mill at Whatawhata and bridges on the Whatawhata to Tuhikaramea road were washed away.

A minimum flow of /second was measured in 1946 and a flood flow of over /sec was measured in the May 1953 floods. In 1958 hundreds of houses were flooded in Ōtorohanga and Tu Kuiti. The July 1998 peak flows in the upper Waipā 776 were the highest recorded since 1958 and at Whatawhata flows were /sec, compared to /sec in 1958.

In July 2002 flows at Whatawhata were /sec and, in March 2004, /sec. The 2004 flood was comparable to that of 1958. At Ōtorohanga, the Primary School and surrounding houses were flooded, when the river spilled into its old course (see map below) and filled the area behind the stop banks. There was also flooding in July 2012.

Power stations 
Work was done in 2006, but, in 2007, Hydro Energy ( Waipā) Ltd was fined for unconsented damage to native vegetation in building the penstock. The resource was initially estimated to be able to generate 10 to 20MW. Construction halted, though Renewable Power Ltd bought the asset in 2010 and estimates potential at 9MW.

In 2017 Nova Energy were given consent to build a 360MW gas-turbine station (connected to the Maui Gas Pipeline) on the Ongaruhe Stream, close to its confluence with the  Waipā. The mid-merit Waikato Power Plant at 869 Kawhia Rd, Ōtorohanga is expected to be used for 10 to 15 minutes, 3 or 4 times a day.

Pollution
Waikato Regional Council measures water quality monthly at five sites from Mangaokewa to Whatawhata. The measurements show poor quality along most of the river, with excess nitrogen, silt and phosphorus, though E. coli levels have improved with improved sewage treatment, though generally not enough for safe swimming; recreational rivers should have median E. coli levels below 126 per 100ml, but  Waipā's range from 160 to 320. Turbidity levels north of Ōtorohanga rise to more than double the levels needed to support plant photosynthesis and phosphorus levels also rise above targets in that stretch. Nitrogen levels increased at all five sites between 1993 and 2012 due to intensified land use, now adding 3,075 tonnes a year. By comparison, the total from sewage works and Te Awamutu dairy factory is 66 tonnes.

Ministry for the Environment figures averaged between 1998 and 2007 showed the Waipā at Ōtorohanga had 280 E.coli per 100ml (53rd worst out of 154), 360 faecal coliforms per 100ml (83rd of 252), 0.55 mg/litre nitrogen (161th of 342) and 0.03 mg/litre phosphorus (187th of 361).

At Pirongia the figures were 390 E.coli per 100ml (35th worst out of 154), 425 faecal coliforms per 100ml (64th of 252), 0.49 mg/litre nitrogen (174th of 342) and 0.06 mg/litre phosphorus (80th of 361).
 
At Whatawhata the figures were 0.92 mg/litre nitrogen (94th of 342) and 0.06 mg/litre phosphorus (69th of 361).
 
In the Mangaokewa stream 0.02 mg/litre phosphorus (237th of 361).

Pollution has been worsening for nitrogen and phosphorus, though turbidity has improved, as shown in this table of important (ie slope direction probability over 95% and RSKSE over ±1% pa) improvements, or deteriorations (-) in relative seasonal Kendall slope estimator (RSKSE) trends (% per year). in the river at Whatawhata (monthly records are flow-adjusted using a Lowess curve fit with 30% span.) -

Soil conservation 

Organic farming 

Bridges 
Listed in order from the confluence with the Waikato and moving south they are:-

1898 Ngāruawāhia bridge opened. Collapsed under a herd of cattle 20 December 1916 (see 1917 photo) and rebuilt in 1922 with three  trusses. The bridges were preceded by a punt (see 1922 photo), supplied by the government in 1887. A new bridge was opened on 18 January 1974.
1914–1958  Waipā Railway and Coal Co.   long bridge.
Repairs were done in 1909, but it was in poor repair again by 1917. For £11,250 a new wooden truss bridge was built over the top of it in 1924 and finished in 1925. The current SH23 concrete bridge, which is south of the original site, was shown on the 1974 edition of the 1 inch Lands & Survey map, but not on the 1965 3rd edition. Records of the road structure show it dates from 1971, which is probably the date of the bridge. The bridge replaced a punt, which had operated from 1867.

Replaced 1957. In 1905, 1907 and 1958, the bridge was flooded to the handrails.
1865 (about) Alexandra Bridge, Baffin St, Pirongia, originally built by the army. Public Works Department estimated its cost at £4,500, £1,500 coming from Government and £3,000 from  Waipā (50%), Raglan (30%) and Waitomo (20%) councils.
1882 Alexandra Bridge, McClure St, Whatiwhatihoe, Pirongia."Mr. Wright has superintended the construction of the Alexandra Bridge, over the  Waipā River, to give access to Tāwhiao's new settlement, Whatiwhatihoe (see map), and which will at the same time eventually be on the main line leading into the King country. The approaches and about a mile of road, and a large culvert have been made by Mr. Wright, with Maori labor. The whole will have been completed at a cost of about £1,800." There was a plan to replace it in 1939. SH39 now crosses on a  1953 bridge.
Kawhia Rd, Ōtorohanga, SH31/SH39 cross on a  1964 bridge. 
Maniapoto St, Ōtorohanga photo about 1910 SH3 now crosses on a  1964 bridge. It replaced a bridge built in the early 1950s.
1887 North Island Main Trunk railway bridge.
1928 Toa Bridge, Otewa Rd.

Steamer services 
In 1885 the river was used to carry material for the railway construction as far as Te Kuiti. Mr Gibbons' steamship, Lillie, started in 1876 to 1878. In 1895 Walsh Bros were running SS Victory. From 1902 to 1909 H H Gould ran the 1899 5 hp SS Opuatia from Ngāruawāhia to Whatawhata one day and on to Pirongia next day. A 1915 guidebook still said, "Small steamers ply up and down the river from Huntly". An 1881 article said a journey upriver would normally take 36 hours, but more in dry weather, when shoals at Whatawhata and Te Rore were hard to cross. An 1898 petition complained about wharfage charges at Mercer being a tax on residents along the  Waipā. Around 1900 the Freetrader, owned by the Waikato Company, "was withdrawn owing to competition from the Walsh brothers with their launch Victory, which could traverse the winding  Waipā much more easily than the cumbersome stern-wheeler."

As late as 1919  Waipā County Council pressed for removal of shingle shoals to permit navigation to Pirongia and got money for improvements from government and the county councils. Evidence given to the Inland Waterways Commission in 1921 said boats carrying 20 tons could reach Pirongia for most of the year and, up to about 30 years before, vessels carried 60 tons to Pirongia and a special fleet of steamers ran to Te Kuiti. Steamers were set back by the sinking of the Opuatia at Whatawhata in 1920. The Waikato Shipping Co had been running a weekly service to Pirongia with the former Waihou River steamer, SS Erin (and sometimes SS Excelsior), which seems to have continued until WSC stopped trading in 1922. A Public Works Department report in 1925 said the river was non-navigable above its junction with the Mangapu at Ōtorohanga.

Settlements
Settlements near the river include Rangitoto, Otewa, Ōtorohanga, Pokuru, Puketōtara, Pirongia, Te Pahu, Te Rore, Ngāhinapōuri, Whatawhata, Te Kowhai, Ngāruawāhia.

References

External links 
 Regional Council summary of information about the river.
 Regional Council water quality information at Whatawhata, Pirongia, Otorohanga, Mangaokewa and water temperatures at Ōtorohanga, and Whatawhata.
 Maps of  Waipā and tributary stream catchments – Ngāruawāhia/Whatawhata, Pirongia/Te Awamutu,  Ōtorohanga/Te Kuiti, south east.
 Maps of pollution – phosphorus, bacteria and turbidity.
 River levels at Ngaruawahia, Whatawhata, Pirongia, Ōtorohanga, Waitomo, Te Kuiti, Otewa.
 Waipā Catchment Plan 2014
 Regional Council lists of actions and conservation areas to support the  Waipā Catchment Plan in 2014/15.
 Encyclopaedia of New Zealand short history
 Lower  Waipā flood control scheme
 Description of fishing in  Waipā and tributaries
 1864 photo of confluence of  Waipā and Waikato
 1910 photo of steam barge delivering goods
 1914 photo of barge and steam tug
 1917 photo of barge, steam tug and factory
 1922 photo of new Ngaruawahia bridge being built
 1951 photo of  Waipā Railway bridge
1958 photo of flood at Te Rore bridge
 1880s photos of Whatawhata Bridge, close up and 1924 rebuilding
 1907 photo of bridge at Ōtorohanga
 Geological maps – 1925 Ngaruawahia, Whatawhata-Te Pahu, Pirongia, 1940 Ōtorohanga, upper Waipā and Pakaumanu.
1:50,000 map of source of  Waipā River
Google street view images show several parts of the river, the uppermost being at Toa Bridge

Rivers of Waikato
Ōtorohanga District
Waipa District
Waikato District
Rivers of New Zealand
Tributaries of the Waikato River